Lincoln City Women FC is an English women's football club affiliated with Lincoln City FC.

History 
Lincoln City Women FC has evolved over the period of time since the club's inception in 2008. They started life as Nettleham Ladies FC and entered the Lincolnshire County Women's League in the same year. In 2009, the club won the Lincolnshire County Women's League and were promoted to East Midlands Women's Football League Division One North, where they remained until 2012.

For the start of 2012/13 season they gained promotion as league champions and were promoted to the East Midlands Women's Football League Premier Division, where they competed until 2017/18 season. They clinched the title by three points, losing just one game all season. The season ended with a 7-0 victory over Grimsby Borough in the County Cup Final.  

Another title winning season was followed by their first season at Tier Four of the women's football pyramid in 2018/19 and they have continued to dominate the Lincolnshire Women's Senior County Cup by winning it in each of the last six seasons.

The summer of 2019 was a landmark in the development of the Club as a successful name change to Lincoln City Women FC meant a total rebranding for the 2019/20 season and a change of Club colours to the famous red and white stripes.

Season-by-season record

Stadium 

Lincoln City Women play their home games at Lincoln Moorlands Sports & Social Club. 

The Development Team plays at Active Nation Yarborough.

Players

Squad

Former players 
Ellie Gilliatt July - December 2020

Olivia Clark (As Nettleham Ladies)

Mary Cooper (2019-20)

Other teams 
Lincoln City Women FC Development Team compete in the FA Women's National Reserve League Midland Division.

Lincoln City Women work closely with the Lincoln City Foundation and the Academy for Women.

Club officials

Coaching staff

 First Team Manager: Lee Mitchell 
 First Team Assistant Manager: Steve Hardie
 Development Team Manager: Jamie Bradley  
 Goalkeeper Coach: Alan Murray

Club Committee

 Chair: Martin Ryder
 Secretary: Phil Hough
 Committee members: Rob Bradley, Ken Tunstall, Adele Would, Rob Bradley, Steven Tointon, Paul Hamnett

Former manager: Richard Cooper June 2018 - January 2021.

Honours 

 East Midlands Women's Football League Premier Division Winners (2017/18)
 Lincolnshire Football Association County Cup Winners (2014, 2015, 2016, 2017, 2018, 2019)

References

External links 

 Official site
 Team details at the FA.com

Lincoln City F.C.
Women's football clubs in England